Sulyman Age Abdulkareem is a professor of chemical engineering and the Vice-Chancellor of the University of Ilorin in Nigeria from 2017 to 2022.

Abdulkareem  graduated from University of Detroit in the US in 1980, with BChE and MChE degrees in chemical engineering. In 1988 he was awarded a Ph.D. by the University of Louisville in the US. His areas of specialisation are heterogeneous catalysis and reaction engineering.

Abdulkareem has worked for the Nigerian Steel Development Company in Ajaokuta, Nigeria, and for 3M in Minnesota, US. He was a research engineer and assistant professor in the King Fahd University of Petroleum and Minerals in Saudi Arabia.

Prior to his appointment at the University of Ilorin, Abdulkareem was Vice-Chancellor of Al-Hikmah University in Ilorin. He was appointed as new Vice-Chancellor of the University of Ilorin on 28 August 2017 and took up his role on 16 October, 2017. He was preceded by Abdul Ganiyu Ambali.

References

Year of birth missing (living people)
Living people
Nigerian chemical engineers
University of Detroit Mercy alumni
Academic staff of the University of Ilorin
University of Louisville alumni